The 1994 National Rowing Championships was the 23rd edition of the National Championships, held from 15–17 July 1994 at the National Water Sports Centre in Holme Pierrepont, Nottingham.

Senior

Medal summary

Lightweight

Medal summary

Under-23

Medal summary

Junior

Medal summary

Coastal

Medal summary 

Key

References 

British Rowing Championships
British Rowing Championships
British Rowing Championships